Club Atlético Atlanta is an Argentine sports club from the Villa Crespo district of Buenos Aires. Nicknamed Los Bohemios ("The Bohemians"), Atlanta is mostly known for its football team, although the institution also hosts the practise of basketball, boxing, martial arts, handball and roller skating.
The squad currently plays at Primera B Nacional, the second division of the Argentine football league system.

History

The club was founded on 12 October 1904 in Buenos Aires, Argentina. One source says that the team got its name from an earthquake that had struck Atlanta, Georgia in the United States at the time the founders got together to inaugurate the club. Another version about its foundation states that the name "Atlanta" was taken from a navy ship that had arrived in the port of Buenos Aires when Manuel Quintana was proclaimed as President of Argentina. Elias Sanz was named as the club's first president.

The club's colors, yellow and blue, where chosen from the awnings that decorated the neighborhood's stores in those years. Atlanta's first home field was in Juan B. Alberdi y Escalada Avenue of the Villa Luro neighborhood, but the club would move repeatedly. This constant movement is the reason why the club was nicknamed Los Bohemios, the Bohemians, which has remained the nickname for the club and its supporters.

At the beginning of 1906, Atlanta was affiliated to the third division of the Argentine Football Association. The team debuted on 22 April 1906, winning its match against Racing. During its first season Atlanta reached the semifinals but then lost to Club Gath & Chaves by 2–0. That same year Atlanta merged with Club Atlético del Oeste, keeping its original name.

Atlanta won the third division championship in 1907, winning its first official title. The team defeated Gimnasia y Esgrima de Buenos Aires by 4–1 on 10 November. The highlight of that season was the thrashing victory over Independiente by 21–1. After winning the title, Atlanta debuted in the second division in 1908, winning the "Copa Bullrich" that played at the same time than regular season. The squad defeated Instituto Americano from Adrogué by 2–1 at the final, played on 8 September.

In popular culture
The club is often associated with the Jewish community because of the historical support of Jews in the area of Villa Crespo; notable Jews have also been part of the team's administration and squad (e.g. Fabian Lagman and Jaime José Rotman).

Derby

Atlanta's main rival is Chacarita Juniors. The rivalry originated in 1922, when Chacarita established very close to Atlanta's home and stadium. The Funebrero stayed there until 1930 when they moved to San Martín, in Greater Buenos Aires, where they have remained since, although the rivalry with Atlanta never ended.

The first official match between both teams was on 13 November 1927 and Chacarita won 2–0. The first time Atlanta defeated the Funebrero was in 1930, with a score of 1–0. In the professional era, the first contest between Atlanta and Chacarita was on 4 June 1931, with Atlanta winning 3–1.

Atlanta and Chacarita have played each other 126 times: Atlanta have won 34, scoring 144 goals. On the other side, Chacarita have won 54 games and scored 191 goals. They have drawn 38 times. The biggest win achieved by Atlanta was in 1944, when they defeated Chacarita 7–1.

Santiago Rico played the most games for Atlanta with 16 appearances, while Luciano Agnolín is the top scorer with 7 goals.

Stadium
The team stadium, "Don León Kolbovsky", is located in Villa Crespo neighborhood, in the city of Buenos Aires. It was inaugurated in 1960 during a match between Atlanta and Argentinos Juniors. Its name is a tribute to the man who presided the club when the stadium began to be built and has a capacity of 34,000. It is also known as the "Wooden Monumental", in reference to River Plate's Estadio Monumental, the biggest and with the largest capacity in Argentina.

In February 2005, the Government of Buenos Aires closed the stadium due to its poor sanitary and security conditions. In January 2006 the stadium was partially re-opened but it was closed again a month later. The same year Atlanta signed a contract with a company to build two concrete grandstands which would replace the wooden one that still stood there. Once the restructuring was finished, Atlanta could play its home games in its own stadium after three years. The León Kolbovsky was re-opened in March 2009, when Atlanta defeated Deportivo Español 3–1 with 6,000 supporters in the new concrete grandstands.

Nickname
Since the team lacked an official home stadium for its first six decades, it was nicknamed "Los Bohemios", as the team would wander from place to place forced to play "home" games in other team's stadiums. The label is also associated with the fans, or any supporter of the team. The singular form, "El Bohemio", is also accepted and can be used when referring to the organization, or a particular player or the actual team.

The "footballer" dog

One of the most curious cases in the history of the club refers to a dog, called "Napoleón" (whose name had been taken from the Emperor of the French) who would become a club legend. The dog had become famous in 1936, when before each match disputed by Atlanta, Napoleón used to show his skills with the ball to the spectators at the Villa Crespo stadium. The animal's awesome ability was claimed even by rival supporters. The dog also barked fiercely when the rival team appeared on the field, and happily wagged his tail when Atlanta players appeared on the field. "Once the referee started the match, Napoleón took his place outside the field and followed the movements of the ball. During a corner kick, the dog always stood behind the goal"

Napoleón had been adopted by Atlanta players after a match against Talleres played in Remedios de Escalada: with the dog on the field, Atlanta scored 4 goals in the second half after being 5–1 down at half-time (when Napoleón could not stay with the team on field). The match finally ended with a 5–5 tie and therefore the dog was adopted by Atlanta players as their mascot, because they considered the dog had brought good luck to the team.

On 6 April 1938, a group of Atlanta supporters met at the house of Napoleón's owner, Francisco Belón. They were making the arrangements to take Napoleón to La Plata for the match Atlanta had to play against Estudiantes. The front door of the house was left opened and the dog ran into the street, and was killed by a car. The newspaper Ahora titled the next day: "Napoleón, a true ace of Porteño football, passed away"

Napoleón was not buried, but his body was embalmed and kept by his owner, Francisco Belón, in the house of Villa Crespo where he lived. In October 2004, when Atlanta celebrated its 100th anniversary, the embalmed body of Napoléon came back to the stadium (now called León Kolbovsky) being exhibited by Francisco Belón's son, Osvaldo. The dog was one of the most loved symbols of the club, along with human celebrities as Osvaldo Miranda (proclaimed as the most famous Atlanta fan by the institution that evening) and Carlos Griguol.

Current squad

Out on loan

Honours
Copa Suecia (1): 1958 
Primera B (5): 1907, 1956, 1983, 1994–95, 2010–11
Copa Bullrich (1): 1908

Notes

References

External links

 

 
Association football clubs established in 1904
Jewish football clubs
Jews and Judaism in Buenos Aires
Argentine handball clubs
1904 establishments in Argentina
Football clubs in Buenos Aires